Yeh Hui Na Mardon Wali Baat is a Pakistani Urdu film directed by Farjad Nabi and Mazhar Zaidi starring Resham, Raheel, Guriya and Munna.

Plot
Yeh hui na mardon wali baat or Now that's more like a man is the Pakistani contribution to a South Asian film project. It has taken a rather peculiar angle to look into the issue of masculinity. Though it's a film about men, there aren't any in it. The film looks at the issue through the eyes of women! The film is a juxtaposing of a series of interview clips of women from different backgrounds. The only common bond among them is that they all hail from Lahore. As these women talk about men in their capacities as brothers, husbands, fathers, lovers etc., a sort of profile of an ideal man emerges. What does the society these women come from, expect of a man?

Background
Yeh Hui Na Mardon Wali Baat is part of a South Asia wide project sponsored by Save the Children UK and UNICEF. In an attempt to explore the concept of masculinity in various cultures of the region, four filmmakers were commissioned from India, Pakistan, Bangladesh and Nepal. These filmmakers tried to investigate different aspects of the issue in their respective environments and produced four different films. These films have been released jointly in Delhi, Dhaka, Kathamandu and Karachi in 1999 and have earned critical reviews across the region.

Cast
 Resham
 Raheel
 Sheetal	
 Usman	
 Yasir
 Munna	
 Guriya

External links
 

2000s Urdu-language films
Pakistani short films
2000 films
Urdu-language Pakistani films